Leslie Ekker (born August 15, 1955)  is an American special effects artist who was nominated at the 68th Academy Awards in the category of Best Visual Effects.  He was nominated for the film Apollo 13, along with Michael Kanfer, Robert Legato and Matt Sweeney.

Selected filmography

Star Trek: The Motion Picture (1979)
Blade Runner (1982)
The Adventures of Buckaroo Banzai Across the 8th Dimension (1984)
Edward Scissorhands (1990)
Hook (1991)
True Lies (1994)
Apollo 13 (1995)
Titanic (1997)

References

External links

1955 births
Living people
Special effects people
Best Visual Effects BAFTA Award winners